The Durg–Ambikapur Express is an Express train belonging to South East Central Railway zone that runs between  and  in India. It is currently being operated with 18241/18242 train numbers on a daily basis.

Service

The 18241/Durg–Ambikapur Express has average speed of 42 km/hr and covers 468 km in 11h 10m. The 18242/Ambikapur–Durg Express has an average speed of 40 km/hr and covers 468 km in 11h 40m.

Route and halts 

The important halts of the train are:

 
 
 
 
 
 
 Kotma
 Bijuri
 Baikunthpur
 Surajpur
 Bishrampur

Coach composition

The train has standard ICF rakes with a max speed of 110 kmph. The train consists of 23 coaches:
 
 0.5 First AC
 2.5 AC II Tier
 4 AC III Tier
 8 Sleeper coaches
 6 General Unreserved
 2 Seating cum Luggage Rake

Traction

Both trains are hauled by a Bhilai-based WAP-7 electric locomotive from Durg to Ambikapur.

Rake sharing

The train shares its rake with 18755/18756 Shahdol–Ambikapur Express.

Direction reversal

The train reverses its direction 1 times:

See also 

 Durg Junction railway station
 Ambikapur railway station
 Shahdol–Ambikapur Passenger

Notes

References

External links 

 18241/Durg–Ambikapur Express
 18242/Ambikapur–Durg Express

Transport in Durg
Express trains in India
Rail transport in Chhattisgarh
Rail transport in Madhya Pradesh